Thurau is a German surname. Notable people with the surname include:

 Björn Thurau (born 1988), German road racing cyclist
 Dietrich Thurau (born 1954), German road racing cyclist
 Friedrich Thurau (1843–1913), German entomologist

German-language surnames